Stray FM was a local radio station serving the western half of North Yorkshire, and sections of West Yorkshire, to the north of Leeds and Bradford, England. The original licence covered the towns of Harrogate and Ripon and the surrounding areas.. From 1 February 2012 the station expanded to cover the Yorkshire Dales.

The station was folded into Greatest Hits Radio Yorkshire, as part of a rebrand, on 1 September 2020.

History

The station started broadcasting on 4 July 1994, eleven years to the day after BBC Radio York started transmitting and two years to the day after Minster FM first went on air. The station had previously operated a number of 28-day broadcasts in the Harrogate area.

In 2008, 97.2 Stray FM was awarded an Arqiva Award for "Station of the Year" (TSA under 300,000).

In 2012, UKRD bought Yorkshire Dales licensee Fresh Radio. Following agreement from Ofcom, the station has announced plans to cede coverage of Richmond to Star Radio North East and to switch off the AM transmitters, rolling the remaining portions of the old Yorkshire Dales licence into an integrated and enlarged licence.

On 17 December 2014, Stray FM started broadcasting on DAB digital radio, under the name Stray Extra. It was broadcast on the North Yorkshire DAB multiplex from various locations within the county, including Bilsdale, Acklam Wold, Hildebrand Barracks and Oliver's Mount. Stray Extra carried Stray FM programmes in the morning and through the day, but during the evening the DAB schedule differed from the FM version, broadcasting its own dedicated programming. The DAB service was later merged with the FM service as Stray FM.

On 5 March 2019, Bauer announced agreement to purchase the UKRD Group. The whole UKRD Group, including Stray FM was placed into hold separate by the Competition and Markets Authority on 12 March 2019  subject to completion of a merger inquiry.

Bauer announced on 27 May 2020 that Stray FM will be rebranded as Greatest Hits Radio Yorkshire from early September 2020.

References

External links 
 

Radio stations in Yorkshire
Radio stations established in 1994
The Local Radio Company
1994 establishments in England